is an arcade-style combat flight simulation video game franchise published by Bandai Namco Entertainment, formerly Namco. Debuting in 1995 with Air Combat for the PlayStation, the series includes eight mainline installments, multiple spin-offs, and other forms of media, such as novels, model kits, and soundtrack albums. Since 2012, the series has been developed primarily by Bandai Namco Studios through its internal development group, Project Aces.

The franchise emphasizes fast-paced action and dramatic plots with semi-realistic gameplay; for example, fighter aircraft have pitch, yaw, and roll control and can stall, but are also able to carry dozens of missiles in hammerspace. As of 2021, the Ace Combat franchise has shipped over 17 million copies worldwide, and has established itself as one of the longest running arcade flight action franchises.

The main series of games takes place in a fictionalized world populated with fictional countries with details loosely based on real-life locations, events, and wars. One of the main selling points of the series is the ability to pilot a range of aircraft that include accurate or slightly modified representations of present-day military aircraft, prototypes that never saw actual battle, and fictional boss-type superweapons. There are hints that the games share a continuity, as some characters and events are referenced from one game to another.

Setting
Most entries in the Ace Combat series are set in "Strangereal", the series' fictional universe. Strangereal's Earth features entirely different nations, geography, continents, and history compared to the real world, though some nations, locations, and events are loosely based on those from real life, and most aircraft in the series are real models with few alterations.

Though Strangereal is very similar to the real modern world, technology is more advanced than it is in real life, allowing for the development of superweapons and theoretical devices such as aerial warships, laser weapons, railguns, submarine and airborne aircraft carriers, orbital weapons, mass drivers, and advanced experimental aircraft. Nuclear weapons exist, but international agreements and nuclear terrorism are implied to have inhibited their development and use, resulting in a lack of nuclear deterrence and a greater focus on conventional weapons in arms races. This makes interstate warfare common, and many nations field large militaries with diverse equipment, develop superweapons, train elite special forces-esque "ace" fighter squadrons, or hire mercenaries to augment their forces.

Most Ace Combat games are set after the 1999 "Ulysses incident", an impact event that occurred after the asteroid Ulysses 1994XF04, discovered to be on an collision course with Earth, was destroyed using anti-asteroid weaponry, only to split into smaller fragments that struck the planet anyway, causing widespread destruction and global crises. The international tensions caused by the Ulysses incident and its aftermath eventually develop into the conflicts depicted in the series, and many of the game's superweapons are described as originating from anti-Ulysses devices. Another major event is the 1995 "Belkan War", during which nuclear bombs were used; vengeful nationalists from Belka, the aggressor and loser of the war, play major roles in most of the series.

As shown in Ace Combat 3: Electrosphere, the nations of Strangereal shown in most of the series are eventually superseded by sovereign megacorporations. Strangereal was later established as part of Bandai Namco's United Galaxy Space Force shared universe, representing the earliest period in its timeline, in which the nations of Strangereal unite to form a world government around 2090.

Ace Combat: Joint Assault, Assault Horizon, and Infinity are not set in Strangereal, and are instead set in their own fictionalized versions of the real world.

Games

 Air Combat (1995) is the debut entry of the series, being released as a launch title for the PlayStation in North America and titled Ace Combat in Japan. Produced by Kazumi Mizuno as a port and successor to a 1993 arcade game of the same name, the plot centers around a terrorist organization seizing control of the Skully Islands, and follows a team of mercenary pilots hired to defeat the terrorists. Air Combat introduced the series' arcade-like gameplay, a contrast to most other flight sim games at the time. In 2005, Air Combat was released for Japanese mobile phones under Namco's game subscription service.
 Ace Combat 2 (1997) was released for the PlayStation, and created out of Namco's dissatisfaction with Air Combat from a technical standpoint. Designed by Masanori Kato, Ace Combat 2 follows Scarface, a squadron of mercenaries (the same from Air Combat) who are hired to liberate the continent of Usea from a group known as the Usean Rebel Forces. The sequel builds upon its predecessor in several ways, adding new mission types, playable aircraft, and multiple difficulty options. Ace Combat 2 was re-released in 2005 for the PlayStation 2 through NamCollection, a Japan-exclusive collection of Namco-developed PlayStation games. In 2011, the game was remade for the 3DS as Ace Combat: Assault Horizon Legacy, featuring new levels, an updated plot, and new game mechanics.
 Ace Combat 3: Electrosphere (1999) was published for the PlayStation, being the last game in the series for the console. While the previous two games carry a modern-day aesthetic, Electrosphere uses a futuristic aesthetic and setting, and follows a conflict between the megacorporations Neucom and General Resource, and the peacekeeping organization UPEO, in a dystopia where corporations have superseded nation states to compete for power. Electrosphere is heavily reliant on story, with branching stage paths and anime-style video emails with full voice acting. The North American version of the game cut down much of its story and content to accommodate for financial constraints.
 Ace Combat 04: Shattered Skies (2001) was the first game in the series to be developed by Project Aces, then-known as the "AC04 Project". Released for the PlayStation 2 and renamed Ace Combat: Distant Thunder in Europe, it was the first entry in the series to thoroughly flesh out Strangereal as the main setting. Initially intended as a series reboot, Shattered Skies returned to the gameplay structure of Air Combat and Ace Combat 2, with fast-paced action and mission variety in a more linear plot. The game's plot tells the story of Mobius 1, a fighter pilot whose legendary exploits during a continent-wide war become instrumental in stopping the country of Erusea's plans to conquer the entire continent of Usea.
 Ace Combat 5: The Unsung War (2004) was released for the PlayStation 2, renamed Ace Combat: Squadron Leader for Europe. Produced by Kazutoki Kono and Project Aces, The Unsung War is one of the most expansive titles in the series, with over 50 playable aircraft and 32 campaign missions, along with fully-animated cutscenes. The plot follows the members of Wardog Squadron, who uncover a conspiracy fueling a large-scale war between the global superpowers of Osea and Yuktobania. The game also features an arcade mode, following Mobius 1 on a mission to defeat Erusean holdouts. In 2018, Bandai Namco Entertainment rereleased The Unsung War for the PlayStation 4 as a pre-order bonus for Ace Combat 7, with slight modifications to allow it to run properly on the console's hardware.
 Ace Combat Zero: The Belkan War (2006) was released for the PlayStation 2, renamed Ace Combat: The Belkan War in Europe. It was the last Ace Combat game developed by Namco before their assets were folded into Bandai Namco Games, who published the game outside Japan, just a week after its launch in Japan. The Belkan War serves as a prequel to The Unsung War, combining ideas and mechanics from both it and Shattered Skies and explaining plot details and lore mentioned in The Unsung War's story. The plot, told through retrospective narration, recounts the exploits of Galm Team, a pair of mercenary pilots hired to defend the country of Ustio and its allies from an invasion by Belka in 1995.
 Ace Combat X: Skies of Deception (2006) was released for the PlayStation Portable as the first entry in the series to be released on the PSP. The game features the ability for the player to choose their own route through the campaign, allowing for multiple different mission combinations in each playthrough. Its plot follows a war between the neighboring countries of Aurelia and Leasath, and the actions of Aurelia's Gryphus Squadron in the fight against Leasath.
 Ace Combat 6: Fires of Liberation (2007) was released for the Xbox 360, marking the series' debut on a Microsoft platform. It was the first Ace Combat title to implement online multiplayer and downloadable content, which have become staple inclusions since. Alongside a standalone release, Namco Bandai bundled Fires of Liberation with the Ace Edge, a flight stick designed by Hori specifically for the game, and a custom Xbox 360 console faceplate. Its story revolves around an invasion of Emmeria by the neighboring country of Estovakia, and the subsequent efforts of Emmerian forces to take back their country, led by the pilots of Garuda Team. In 2018, Bandai Namco Entertainment re-released Fires of Liberation for the Xbox One as a pre-order bonus for Ace Combat 7, with slight modifications to allow it to run properly on the console's hardware.
 Ace Combat: Joint Assault (2010) was released for the PlayStation Portable as the first game in the series to be set in the real world. The game's campaign features cooperative gameplay for up to four players, and new aerial combat mechanics that simplify dogfights. Joint Assaults plot follows the pilots of Martinez Security, a private military company hired to help defeat a heavily-armed global terrorist force.
 Ace Combat: Assault Horizon (2011) was released for the PlayStation 3 and Xbox 360, with a later release for Microsoft Windows in 2013 through Steam. Assault Horizon features significant gameplay differences compared to other entries in the series, such as a "dogfight mode" and "airstrike mode" to simplify gameplay, a "gritty" Call of Duty-esque art direction, and unique turret sections for helicopters, gunships, and bombers, the first time in the series that these types of aircraft are playable. Set in the real world, but in a different universe than Joint Assault, the game's plot follows the 108th Task Force, a joint coalition of U.S. and Russian forces deployed to defeat heavily-armed insurgencies and criminal organizations.
 Ace Combat Infinity (2014) was released for the PlayStation 3 as the series' first free-to-play entry. The game featured expansive multiplayer modes and a freemium model. Set in the real world, but in a different universe than Joint Assault and Assault Horizon, Infinity follows the aftermath of a real-world Ulysses incident and the rise of a terrorist organization in devastated Eurasia, with the United Nations enlisting several private military companies to fight back. Infinity's services were discontinued in 2018, with its plot left on a cliffhanger.
 Ace Combat 7: Skies Unknown (2019) was published for the PlayStation 4, Xbox One, and PC through Steam, and was the first mainline installment released in twelve years. It was created based on the commercial success of Ace Combat Infinity, with its mechanics being borrowed from both it and Ace Combat: Assault Horizon. Designed by Project Aces and headed by producer Kazutoki Kono, Skies Unknown features multiple additions to the series, including multiple game modes, enhancements to the ship tuning concept from Ace Combat X, and virtual reality support through PlayStation VR. Returning to the series' traditional setting of Strangereal, the game, set during a war between Osea and Erusea over a space elevator, follows the exploits of Trigger, an Osean pilot who is tasked with clearing his name after a false accusation of murder lands him in a penal squadron. The game also features three VR missions set five years before the campaign, following Mobius 1's continued fight against the Erusean holdouts seen in The Unsung Wars arcade mode.
 An untitled Ace Combat entry was confirmed to be in development in August 2021. The new entry is being developed by Namco and ILCA. As of December 2022, few details about the upcoming entry have been released, and no release date has been announced.

Title differences 
Some Ace Combat games have differences in their title, depending on the region (NTSC or PAL) the game was sold in:

 The Japanese Ace Combat was renamed Air Combat in the North American and European releases of the original game. The second game was initially set to be released as Air Combat 2 in the U.S., but by the time of release the game (and series) switched to using Ace Combat internationally.
 In NTSC territories, the fourth installment of the series is known as Ace Combat 04: Shattered Skies, while in PAL territories the game is known as Ace Combat: Distant Thunder. The Spanish version of the game is known as Ace Combat: Trueno de Acero, which can be translated as Ace Combat: Steel Thunder.
 The NTSC version of the fifth installment of the game is known as Ace Combat 5: The Unsung War, while the PAL release was renamed Ace Combat: Squadron Leader.
 In PAL territories, the word "Zero" in Ace Combat Zero: The Belkan War was removed, making it the first game since the series introduction to not have a significant name change in PAL territories.
 Ace Combat: Assault Horizon Legacy in English-speaking territories was originally titled Ace Combat 3D: Cross Rumble in Japan.

Printed media
With the release of Assault Horizon in 2011, Project Aces created Aces at War: A History, a special artbook detailing the content from Ace Combat 04, 5, and Zero from an in-universe perspective, as well as production commentary. This was packaged with the special editions of Assault Horizon released in Japan. Aces at War: A History would later be updated and rereleased as part of a special edition of Ace Combat 7: Skies Unknown.

In March 2012, ASCII Media Works released Ace Combat: Ikaros in the Sky. A tie-in novel for Assault Horizon, Ikaros tells a story of series character Kei Nagase as she participates in the JASDF's ASF-X Shinden II fighter program.

Reception

Ace Combat has been a consistent commercial success, with most mainline installments reaching over one million units shipped. Ace Combat 7: Skies Unknown is the most successful title with over 3 million copies shipped by 2021, followed by Ace Combat 04: Shattered Skies and Air Combat. The games have sold well predominantly in North America and Japan, where over 75% of all revenue was generated from the series by 2008. In total, the Ace Combat franchise has shipped over  copies.

See also

 Air Combat 22
 Project Wingman
 The Sky Crawlers: Innocent Aces, a spiritual spin-off released exclusively on the Wii as a tie-in for the film The Sky Crawlers

Notes

References

External links

Ace Combat official website

 
Bandai Namco Entertainment franchises
Video game franchises
Fiction about aerial warfare
Combat flight simulators
Video game franchises introduced in 1995